The 2017 Baltic Futsal Cup was held on 9–11 December 2017 in Lithuania. This edition featured the three Baltic teams.

Standings

Matches

Goalscorers 
3 goals

  Justinas Zagurskas
  Artūrs Jerofejevs

2 goals
  Maksimas Aleksejevas

1 goal

  Andrei Antonov
  Erik Grigorjev
  Oskars Ikstens
  Andreja Aleksejeva
  Arsenijus Buinickis
  Arsenij Buinickij

Awards 

 Top Scorer
  Justinas Zagurskas and  Artūrs Jerofejevs (3 goals)

External links 
Futsal Planet

2017
2017 in Lithuanian football
2017 in Latvian football
2017 in Finnish football
2017 in Estonian football
International futsal competitions hosted by Estonia
2016–17 in European futsal